Waxhaw Presbyterian Church Cemetery, also known as Old Waxhaw Cemetery, is a historic Presbyterian church cemetery located near Lancaster, Lancaster County, South Carolina. It was founded in 1757 and is a visual reminder of the pioneer settlement of Waxhaw.  It includes noteworthy examples of 18th and 19th century tombstones.

It was added to the National Register of Historic Places in 1975.

Notable burials
 William Richardson Davie, Governor of North Carolina, 1798
 Andrew Jackson, Sr., father of Andrew Jackson
 Andrew Pickens, Sr. and Ann Pickens, parents of Andrew Pickens, U.S. Congressman
 James H. Witherspoon, Lt. Governor of South Carolina, 1826–1828
 Casualties of "Buford's Massacre", May 28, 1780

References

Further reading
 Patterson, Daniel W., "Backcountry Legends of a Minister's Death," Southern Spaces, 30 October 2012.

Presbyterian churches in South Carolina
Cemeteries on the National Register of Historic Places in South Carolina
1757 establishments in the Thirteen Colonies
Protestant Reformed cemeteries
Churches in Lancaster County, South Carolina
National Register of Historic Places in Lancaster County, South Carolina